Ryan David Rickelton (born 11 July 1996) is a South African cricketer. He made his international debut for the South Africa cricket team on 31 March 2022. A left handed wicket-keeper batter, Rickelton represents Gauteng domestically.

Domestic career
He made his first-class debut for Gauteng against Northerns. In August 2017, he was named in Nelson Mandela Bay Stars' squad for the first season of the T20 Global League. He made his Twenty20 debut for Gauteng in the 2017 Africa T20 Cup on 1 September 2017. However, in October 2017, Cricket South Africa initially postponed the tournament until November 2018, with it being cancelled soon after.

He was the leading run-scorer in the 2017–18 CSA Provincial One-Day Challenge tournament for Gauteng, with 351 runs in eight matches. He was also the leading run-scorer in the 2017–18 Sunfoil 3-Day Cup for Gauteng, with 562 runs in six matches.

In June 2018, he was named in the squad for the Highveld Lions team for the 2018–19 season. The following month, he was named in the Cricket South Africa Emerging Squad. In October 2018, he was named in Jozi Stars' squad for the first edition of the Mzansi Super League T20 tournament. In September 2019, he was named in the squad for the Jozi Stars team for the 2019 Mzansi Super League tournament. Later the same month, he was named in Gauteng's squad for the 2019–20 CSA Provincial T20 Cup.

In February 2022, Rickelton was named as the captain of the Imperial Lions for the 2021–22 CSA T20 Challenge.

In 2022, Rickelton signed with Northamptonshire for that year's edition of the County Championship

International career
In January 2021, he was named in South Africa's Twenty20 International (T20I) squad for their series against Pakistan. In April 2021, he was named in Gauteng's squad, ahead of the 2021–22 cricket season in South Africa. In May 2021, he was named in the South Africa A's squad to play against the Zimbabwe A cricket team for their tour to Zimbabwe. He scored 224 runs in the List A series including a century, being the highest run-scorer in the series.

In November 2021, he was named in South Africa's One Day International (ODI) squad for their series against the Netherlands. The following month, Rickelton was named in South Africa's Test squad for the series against India. In January 2022, he received a further call-up to the Test side, for their tour of New Zealand. In March 2022, Rickleton was also named in South Africa's Test squad for their series against Bangladesh. He made his Test debut on 31 March 2022, for South Africa against Bangladesh. He made his ODI debut against the West Indies on 18 March 2023.

References

External links
 

1996 births
Living people
South African cricketers
South Africa Test cricketers
Gauteng cricketers
Lions cricketers
Jozi Stars cricketers
Northamptonshire cricketers
MI Cape Town cricketers